Kut-e Mahna (also Romanized as Kūt-e Mahnā, Kut-e Mohannā, and Kūt Mohannā; also known as Kut) is a village in Soviren Rural District, Cham Khalaf-e Isa District, Hendijan County, Khuzestan Province, Iran. At the 2006 census, its population was 137, in 25 families.

References 

Populated places in Hendijan County